Leveque (Lévêque, Levêque) is a surname, and may refer to:

 André Lévêque, French engineer
 Auguste Levêque, Belgian painter
 Christophe Lévêque, French BMX racer
 Dorian Lévêque, French footballer
 Guy Leveque, Canadian ice hockey player
 John Leveque, sound editor
 Louise Leveque de Vilmorin, French writer
 Matt Leveque, Canadian lacrosse player
 Pierre Lévêque (1921–2004), French hellenist and historian
 Randall J. LeVeque, American applied mathematician
 Roger Lévêque, French cycle racer
 William J. LeVeque (1923–2007), American mathematician
 Leslie L. LeVeque, inventor of the automatic pinsetter, after whom the LeVeque Tower was named.

See also
 Levesque
 LeVeque Tower

Occupational surnames